Cayla Nicole Drotar (born January 27, 1998) is an American softball player. She attended Hartsville High School in Hartsville, South Carolina. She later attended the University of South Carolina, where she pitched for the South Carolina Gamecocks softball team.

References

External links
 
South Carolina bio

1998 births
Softball players from South Carolina
Living people
People from Hartsville, South Carolina
South Carolina Gamecocks softball players